Djègbè may refer to several places in Benin:

Djègbè, Collines
Djègbè, Zou